GATO is a real-time submarine simulator first published in 1984 by Spectrum HoloByte for DOS. It simulates combat operations aboard the Gato-class submarine  in the Pacific Theater of World War II. GATO was later ported to the Apple IIe, Atari ST, and Macintosh. In 1987, Atari Corporation published a version on cartridge for the Atari 8-bit family, to coincide with the launch of the Atari XEGS.

Gameplay 
The player is tasked with chasing Japanese shipping across a 20-sector map while returning for resupply as necessary from a submarine tender. The islands on the map are randomly generated and not based on real-world geography. Combat is conducted using a screen with a view through the periscope and at various gauges and indicators. The game has multiple difficulty levels, the highest of which requires the player to translate mission briefings which are transmitted only as audible Morse Code.

The MS-DOS and Apple IIe versions contain a boss key which replaces the game screen with a spreadsheet.

Development 
Gato was developed by student programmers in Boulder, Colorado.

Reception 
Billboard magazine reported in June 1985 Gato coming in at number 6 of a national sample of retail sales and rack sales reports.

In 1985, Computer Gaming World praised the game for being simultaneously easy to play and having deep, detailed strategy. 1991 and 1993 surveys in the magazine of strategy and war games, however, gave it one and a half stars out of five, stating that "it was adequate in its time, but not exemplary in any regard". Compute! stated that "Gato promises realism, and it delivers ... [it] lives up to its claims". Jerry Pournelle wrote favorably of the game in BYTE, stating that he wished he could slow the game down but "I've certainly wasted enough time with it ... Recommended", and that he preferred the black-and-white Macintosh version to the color IBM PC version.

Reviews
The V.I.P. of Gaming Magazine #2 (Feb./March, 1986)

References

External links

Of AJAX, GATO, and Bill Scott
Review in GAMES Magazine

1984 video games
Apple II games
Atari 8-bit family games
Atari ST games
Cancelled Atari 7800 games
Commodore 64 games
DOS games
Japan in non-Japanese culture
Classic Mac OS games
Single-player video games
Spectrum HoloByte games
Submarine simulation video games
Video games developed in the United States
Video games set in Oceania
Pacific War video games